Alexandr Panfierov is a Russian glider aerobatic pilot who
won the FAI World Glider Aerobatic Championships and World Air Games Glider Aerobatics Championships 2001.

References

External links
 2nd World Air Games 2001 - Glider Aerobatics

Glider pilots
Aerobatic pilots
Russian aviators
Living people
Year of birth missing (living people)